SM Jaleel & Company Ltd, also known as SMJ, is the largest manufacturer of non alcoholic drinks in the English speaking Caribbean. Since inception in 1924 their portfolio of beverages are distributed to over 60 countries worldwide.

Business Segment 

SMJ’s products include a wide array of soft drinks, fruit juices, purified and flavoured water, energy drinks, and other fruit flavoured beverages.

SMJ's blow molding facility is the largest in the Caribbean where they manufacture their own PET bottles in different shapes and sizes for their numerous products.

The company was also the first in the world, in conjunction with Reynolds Metals Company, to fill fruit juices in aluminum cans using nitrogen technology in the 1980s, thus eliminating the need for artificial preservatives in the product.

Currently, SMJ’s products are found in over half a million wholesale and retail stores worldwide, including Walmart and other international retailers. The company has more than 2000 employees in five continents.

History 

S.M. Jaleel was founded in 1924 by Sheik Mohameed Jaleel, and was located at the corner of Keate and Prince Alfred Streets in San Fernando, Trinidad and Tobago with a 25 member staff.

History and Timeline

Locations

SM Jaleel's headquarters reside at the Otaheite Industrial Estate in South Oropouche, Trinidad and Tobago. There are subsidiary offices in Jamaica, Barbados, Suriname, Guyana, St. Lucia, South Africa and Asia.

Products Manufactured and Distributed by SMJ

Juices & Juice Drinks 
 Fruta
 Fruta Kool Kidz
 Caribbean Cool
 Trinidad Juices
 Tampico
 Trinidad Fresh

Carbonated soft drinks
 American Classic
 Busta
 Chubby
 Cole Cold
 Seagrams

Water
 Cool Runnings
 Island Mist
 Mt. Pelier
 Oasis
 Viva

Energy drinks
 Turbo Energy Drink

Isotonic drinks
 Altitude

Iced teas
 Island Fusion

Consideration for the Environment 

 Approximately 10% of all virgin (rejected) bottles before being filled are sterilized and re-injected into the line.
 Re-use of the liners that come with the pallets of empty cans, for lining the sugar pallets, and the stacked finished product.
 Collection of wasted water in special pipe lines to re-use for cooling equipment on the plant.
 Since 2004 SMJ has been making PET bottles lighter in weight by using less material in its composition to create less post consumer waste.
 Sale of all post industrial material (returned bottles, cans and plastic), cardboard, pallets and metal drums to recycling companies.
 Use of shredding machines both in Barbados, which shred returned plastic (PET) bottles (post consumption). The shredded plastic is packed in sacks and exported to international recycling companies. The PET flakes are used by these companies to make various things like carpeting, wall insulation, and polyester T-shirts.
 Purchase of large quantities of oranges and grapefruit from local farmers for use in the freshly squeezed juice products (for Trinidad Juices - Not from concentrate). The peel from these fruits are processed to make animal feed.

References

Drink companies of Trinidad and Tobago
Brands of Trinidad and Tobago